SimCity, also known as Micropolis or SimCity Classic, is a city-building simulation video game developed by Will Wright, and released for a number of platforms from 1989 to 1991. SimCity features two-dimensional graphics and an overhead perspective. The game's objective is to create a city, develop residential and industrial areas, build infrastructure, and collect taxes for further city development. Importance is placed on increasing the population's standard of living, maintaining a balance between the different sectors, and monitoring the region's environmental situation to prevent the settlement from declining and going bankrupt.

SimCity was independently developed by Will Wright, beginning in 1985; the game would not see its first release until 1989. Because the game lacked any arcade or action elements that dominated the video game market in the 1980s, video game publishers declined to release the title for fear of its commercial failure until Broderbund eventually agreed to distribute it. Although the game initially sold poorly, positive feedback from the gaming press boosted its sales. After becoming a best-seller, SimCity was released on several other platforms, most notably on the Super Nintendo Entertainment System (SNES) in 1991. Its gameplay was significantly revised with Nintendo's involvement.

SimCity sold 300,000 units for personal computers and nearly 2 million units for the SNES. SimCity was met with critical acclaim for its innovative and addictive gameplay despite the absence of action elements. Reviewers considered the game instructive and helpful toward the player's understanding of urban planning, politics, and economics. SimCity received numerous awards from news publishers and associations. The success of SimCity marked the beginning of the urban simulation genre of video games, as well as publisher Maxis' tradition of producing non-linear simulation games, one of which – The Sims – would surpass all its predecessors in popularity and become one of the best-selling franchises in the video game industry.

Gameplay
The core concept of SimCity is to build and design a city without specific goals to achieve. The player get to mark land as being zoned as commercial, industrial, or residential, add buildings, change the tax rate, build a power grid, build transportation systems and take any other actions to enhance the city. Once able to construct buildings in a particular area, the too-small-to-see residents, known as "Sims", may choose to construct and upgrade houses, apartment blocks, light, heavy industrial buildings, commercial buildings, hospitals, churches, and other structures. The Sims make these choices based on such factors as traffic levels, availability of electrical power, crime levels, and proximity to other types of buildings—for example, residential areas next to a power plant will seldom appreciate the highest grade of housing. In the SNES version and later, the player can also build rewards when they are given, such as the mayor's mansion or a casino.

The player may face disasters including flooding, tornadoes, fires (often from air disasters or shipwrecks), earthquakes and attacks by monsters. In addition, monsters and tornadoes can trigger train crashes by running into passing trains.

Scenarios
SimCity includes goal-centered, timed scenarios that could be won or lost depending on the performance of the player. The scenarios were an addition suggested by Broderbund to make SimCity more like a game. The original cities were based on real-world cities and attempted to re-create their general layout. While most scenarios either take place in a fictional timeline or have a city under siege by a fictional disaster, a handful of available scenarios are based on actual historical events.

Development

SimCity was developed by game designer Will Wright. While working on the game Raid on Bungeling Bay, in which the player flies a helicopter dropping bombs on islands, Wright found he enjoyed designing the islands in the level editor rather than playing the actual game. This led him to develop increasingly sophisticated level editors. At the same time, Wright was cultivating a love of the intricacies and theories of urban planning and acknowledges the influence of System Dynamics which was developed by Jay Wright Forrester and whose book on the subject laid the foundations for what would become SimCity. In addition, Wright also was inspired by reading "The Seventh Sally", a short story from The Cyberiad by Stanisław Lem, in which an engineer encounters a deposed tyrant, and creates a miniature city with artificial citizens for the tyrant to oppress. The game reflected Wright's approval of mass transit and disapproval of nuclear power; Maxis president Jeff Braun stated "We're pushing political agendas".

The first version of the game was developed for the Commodore 64 in 1985; it was not published for another four years. The original working title of SimCity was Micropolis. The game was unusual in that it could neither be won or lost; as a result, game publishers did not believe it was possible to market and sell such a game successfully. Broderbund declined to publish the title when Wright proposed it, and he pitched it to a range of major game publishers without success. Finally, Braun, founder of the tiny software company Maxis, agreed to publish SimCity as one of two initial games for the company.

Wright and Braun returned to Broderbund to formally clear the rights to the game in 1988, when SimCity was near completion. After Broderbund executives Gary Carlston and Don Daglow saw SimCity, they signed Maxis to a distribution deal for both of its initial games. With that, four years after initial development, SimCity was released for the Amiga and Macintosh platforms, followed by the IBM PC and Commodore 64 later in 1989.

Ports and versions

After the original release on the Amiga and Macintosh, the game was released on the Commodore 64 and IBM PC compatibles, and afterward saw more releases for computers and video game consoles:  Atari ST, Acorn Archimedes, Amstrad CPC, ZX Spectrum, BBC Micro, Acorn Electron, Super Nintendo Entertainment System, EPOC32, mobile phone, Internet, Windows, FM-Towns, OLPC XO-1 and News HyperLook on Sun Unix. The game is available as a multiplayer version for X11 Tcl/Tk on various Unix, Linux, DESQview and OS/2 operating systems.

Shortly after the game's initial release, Maxis released the SimCity Terrain Editor for the original versions of the game, which was sold as a mail-order add-on in North America but gained a standalone retail release in Europe. The Terrain Editor is a simple tool that allows the user to create maps with forest, land, and water portions. In 1990, Maxis developed two 'Graphics Sets' packs for the MS-DOS and Amiga versions: "Ancient Cities" and "Future Cities". Each pack contained 3 sets which changed the graphics and messages in the game to fit certain themes.

In 1991, an enhanced version of the game was released for Windows 3.0/3.1. It runs in the Windows GDI with new sounds and music, either PC-Speaker type or digital/MIDI type. In 1992, to coincide with other re-releases of their games, Maxis re-released the Windows version of SimCity as "SimCity Classic", which bundled the game with the MS-DOS version of the Terrain Editor. The Graphics Sets were also reissued to run on Windows 3.1 as well. SimCity Classic was re-released in 1993 as part of the SimClassics Volume 1 compilation alongside SimAnt and SimLife for PC, Mac and Amiga. In 1995, a Windows 95 compatible version of the game titled "SimCity Deluxe CD-ROM" was released, which included new 256-color graphics and sound, and bundled the Graphics Sets and an updated Terrain Editor together with the base game.

In 1994, Interplay Productions developed and published under license from Maxis a version of the game titled "SimCity Enhanced CD-ROM" for DOS, which included 256 color graphics and FMV movies that would trigger events.

MS-DOS SimCity version 1.00 supports a variety of graphics modes: CGA monochrome 640x200, EGA color 320x200, Tandy 640x200 mode, Hercules 720x348 mono, and EGA 640x350 in color or mono. v1.07 added MCGA 640x480 mono.  A  v2.00 release (SimCity "Classic") dropped all the 200-line modes and added VGA 640x480 16-color and a VGA/MCGA 320x200 256-color mode.

Super Nintendo

SimCity for the SNES features the same gameplay and scenario features; however, since it was developed and published by Nintendo, the company incorporated their own ideas. Instead of the Godzilla monster disaster, Bowser of the Super Mario series becomes the attacking monster, and once the city reaches a landmark 500,000 populace, the player receives a Mario statue that can be placed in the city. The SNES port also features special buildings the player may receive as rewards, such as casinos, large parks, amusement parks, and expo centers; some of which would be incorporated into SimCity 2000. A bank can be built which will allow a loan of $10,000 to be taken, but it must be paid back before another loan can be taken out. The game includes schools and hospitals, though they cannot be placed by the player; instead, the game will sometimes turn an empty residential lot into one. There are city classifications, such as becoming a metropolis of 100,000 people. It has some of the same pre-set scenarios in the PC and Mac versions and two new ones. One is in Las Vegas under attack by aliens and another is called Freeland. Freeland has no water, and no rewards for buildings are given. Also unique to the SNES version is a character named "Dr. Wright" (whose physical appearance is based on Will Wright) who acts as an adviser to the player. The soundtrack was composed by Soyo Oka. The edition is featured as Nintendo's Player's Choice as a million-seller.

In August 1996, a version of the game entitled BS SimCity Machizukuri Taikai was broadcast to Japanese players via the Super Famicom's Satellaview subsystem. Later, a sequel titled SimCity 64 was released for Nintendo 64DD, the Japan-only Nintendo 64 add-on.

Cancelled NES version

A version for the Nintendo Entertainment System (NES) was announced alongside the SNES version and had been showcased at the 1991 Consumer Electronics Show, but the NES version was never properly released. However, prototype cartridges for the NES version were discovered in 2017, and one copy was obtained by video game preservationist Frank Cifaldi, who extensively documented its features compared to the original personal computer game and the SNES version. It featured a completely different soundtrack (also composed by Oka) from that of the SNES version; besides Metropolis Theme, a composition that Oka herself considers one of her best works.

Micropolis

In January 2008, the SimCity source code was released as free software under the GPL-3.0-or-later license, renamed to Micropolis (the original working title) for trademark reasons, and developed by Don Hopkins. The release of the source code was motivated by the One Laptop Per Child program. The Micropolis source code has been translated to C++, integrated with Python and interfaced with both GTK+ and OpenLaszlo.

In 2008, Maxis established an online browser-based version of SimCity. A second browser-based version was later released under the name Micropolis. In 2013, a browser-based version was released, ported using JavaScript and HTML5, as micropolisJS.
	 
Since Micropolis is licensed under the GPL-3.0-or-later, users can do anything they want with it that conforms with the GPL-3.0-or-laterthe only restriction is that they cannot call it "SimCity" (along with a few other limitations to protect EA's trademarks). This allows other, differently named projects to be forked from the Micropolis source code. Improvements to the open-source code base that merit EA's approval may be incorporated into the official "OLPC SimCity" source code, to be distributed with the OLPC under the trademarked name OLPC SimCity, but only after it has been reviewed and approved by EA.

Comparison of different versions

 SimCity Classic is available for Palm OS and on the SimCity.com website as Classic Live. It was also released by Atelier Software for the Psion 5 handheld computer, and mobile phones in 2006.
 The July 2005 issue of Nintendo Power stated that a development cartridge of SimCity for the NES was found at Nintendo headquarters. Never released, it is reportedly the only one in existence.
 Additionally a terrain editor and architecture disks were available with tileset graphics for settings of Ancient Asia, Medieval, Wild West, Future Europe, Future USA and a Moon Colony.
 Versions of SimCity for the BBC Micro, Acorn Electron, and Acorn Archimedes computers were published by Superior Software/Acornsoft. Programmer Peter Scott had to squeeze the 512k Amiga version of the game into 20k to run on the aging 32k BBC Micro and Acorn Electron. Despite this, it kept almost all of the functionality of the Amiga game and very similar graphics (although only using four colors).
 DUX Software published a Unix version of SimCity for the NeWS window system using the HyperLook user interface environment, and a multiplayer version of SimCity for the X11 window system using the Tcl/Tk user interface toolkit, both developed and ported to various platforms by Don Hopkins.

Reception

SimCity was a financial success, selling one million copies by late 1992. In the United States, it was the ninth best-selling computer game from 1993 to 1999, with another 830,000 units sold. It was critically acclaimed and received significant recognition within a year after its initial release. As of December 1990, the game was reported to have won the following awards:

In addition, SimCity won the Origins Award for "Best Military or Strategy Computer Game" of 1989 in 1990, was named to Computer Gaming Worlds Hall of Fame for games readers highly rated over time, and the multiplayer X11 version of the game was also nominated in 1992 as the Best Product of the Year in Unix World. Macworld named the Macintosh version of SimCity the Best Simulation Game of 1989, putting it into the Macintosh Game Hall of Fame. Macworld, in their review, praised its graphics as well as its strategic gameplay, calling it "A challenging, dynamic game, realistic and unpredictable", and notes how "as the population grows the city's needs change." SimCity was named No. 4 "Ten Greatest PC Game Ever" by PC World in 2009. It was named one of the sixteen most influential games in history at Telespiel, a German technology and games trade show, in 2007. Sid Meier in 2008 named SimCity as one of the three most important innovations in videogame history, as it led to other games that encouraged players to create, not destroy. It was named No. 11 on IGN's 2009 "Top 25 PC Games of All Time" list. In 1996, Computer Gaming World declared SimCity the 6th-best computer game ever released. In 2018, Complex rated SimCity 50th on its "The Best Super Nintendo Games of All Time." In 1995, Total! listed SimCity 89th on their "Top 100 SNES Games." IGN ranked the game 35th in its "Top 100 SNES Games of All Time."

Mike Siggins reviewed SimCity for Games International magazine, and gave it 5 stars out of 5, and stated that "Overall, SimCity must be ranked right up there in the all-time Amiga classics. It is the first title that I have come across to turn a 'serious' theme into a passable simulation while also making for an excellent game."

Entertainment Weekly gave the game an B+.

Johnny L. Wilson reviewed the game for Computer Gaming World, and stated that "Dynamic is exactly the right word for this product. There is constant strategy involved in the placement of zones, road building, political decision-making, and damage control."

In 1991, PC Format named SimCity one of the 50 best computer games ever. The editors called it "a town planner's dream".

The University of Southern California and University of Arizona used SimCity in urban planning and political science classes. Chuck Moss of The Detroit News found that Godzilla attacking the city in the 1972 Detroit scenario caused less destruction than the mayoralty of Coleman Young. In 1990 The Providence Journal invited five candidates for Mayor of Providence, Rhode Island to manage a SimCity town resembling the city. Victoria Lederberg blamed her close loss in the Democratic primary on the newspaper's description of her poor performance in the game; former mayor Buddy Cianci, the most successful player, won the election that year.

The SimCity Terrain Editor was reviewed in 1989 in Dragon No. 147 by Hartley, Patricia, and Kirk Lesser in "The Role of Computers" column. The reviewers gave the expansion 4 out of 5 stars.

The ZX Spectrum version was voted number 4 in the Your Sinclair Readers' Top 100 Games of All Time.

In 2004, SimCity was inducted into GameSpot's list of the greatest games of all time.

On March 12, 2007, The New York Times reported that SimCity was named to a list of the ten most important video games of all time, the so-called game canon. The Library of Congress took up a video game preservation proposal and began with the games from this list, including SimCity.

Legacy

SimCity yielded several sequels. "Sim" games of many types were developedwith Will Wright and Maxis developing myriad titles including SimEarth, SimFarm, SimTown, Streets of SimCity, SimCopter, SimAnt, SimLife, SimIsle, SimTower, SimPark, SimSafari, and The Sims, which spawned its own series, as well as the unreleased SimsVille and SimMars. They also obtained licenses for some titles developed in Japan, such as SimTower and Let's Take The A-Train (released as A-Train outside Japan). Spore, released in 2008, was originally going to be titled "SimEverything"a name that Will Wright thought might accurately describe what he was trying to achieve.

SimCity inspired a new genre of video games. "Software toys" that were open-ended with no set objective were developed trying to duplicate SimCity's success. The most successful was Wright's own The Sims, which went on to be the best selling computer game of all time. The ideas pioneered in SimCity have been incorporated into real-world applications as well, as urban developers have recognized that the game's design was "gamification" of city planning by integrating numerous real-world systems for a city or region interacted to project growth or change. For example, VisitorVille simulates a city based on website statistics. Several real-world city improvement projects started with models inspired by SimCity prior to implementation, particularly with the onset of more connected smart cities.

The series also spawned a SimCity collectible card game, produced by Mayfair Games. Rick Swan reviewed SimCity: The Card Game for Dragon magazine No. 221 (September 1995). Swan says that "While the card game doesn't scale the heights of the computer game, it comes close."

Dr. Wright from the SNES version has made appearances in several video games. He is a non-player character in The Legend of Zelda: Link's Awakening, and an assist trophy in the Super Smash Bros. series.

See also

 Government simulation
 Municipal government, the basis for SimCity
 Urban planning
 Regional planning
 List of open source games

References

External links
 
 Official website for the Super Famicom version
 
 

1989 video games
Acorn Archimedes games
Amiga games
Amstrad CPC games
Android (operating system) games
Atari ST games
BBC Micro and Acorn Electron games
Browser games
Business simulation games
Cancelled Nintendo Entertainment System games
City-building games
Commercial video games with freely available source code
Commodore 64 games
Commodore CDTV games
DOS games
DOS games ported to Windows
FM Towns games
Freeware games
God games
IOS games
IRIX games
Linux games
Classic Mac OS games
Palm OS games
Mobile games
NEC PC-9801 games
Nintendo games
Nintendo Entertainment Analysis and Development games
Origins Award winners
Unix games
X68000 games
SimCity
Software that uses Tk (software)
Super Nintendo Entertainment System games
Superior Software games
Symbian games
Top-down video games
Video games developed in the United States
Video games scored by Soyo Oka
Video games with oblique graphics
Video games with tile-based graphics
Virtual Console games
Windows games
ZX Spectrum games
Video games set in Germany
Video games set in San Francisco
Video games set in Switzerland
Video games set in Detroit
Video games set in Tokyo
Video games set in Boston
Hamburg in fiction
Video games set in Brazil
Rio de Janeiro (city) in fiction
Video games scored by Russell Lieblich
Video games set in the 20th century
Video games set in the 21st century
Video games set in Nevada
Video games with alternative versions
Video games about Nazi Germany
J2ME games
Acornsoft games

de:SimCity